Gap junction gamma-1 protein (GJC1), also known as gap junction alpha-7 protein (GJA7) and connexin 45 (Cx45) — is a protein that in humans is encoded by the GJC1 gene.

Function 

This gene is a member of the connexin gene family. The encoded protein is a component of gap junctions, which are composed of arrays of intercellular channels that provide a route for the diffusion of low molecular weight materials from cell to cell. Alternatively spliced transcript variants encoding the same isoform have been described.

References

Further reading

External links
 
 

Connexins